The Women's doubles competition began on 11 October 2010. There were a total of 64 competitors in 32 teams.

Elimination rounds

See also
2010 Commonwealth Games
Table tennis at the 2010 Commonwealth Games

References

Table tennis at the 2010 Commonwealth Games
Common